Mendoza is a town in the San Nicolás District and capital of the Rodríguez de Mendoza Province, located in the South part East of the Amazonas Region, Peru.

Mendoza is served by the San Nicolas Airport.

Mendoza is characterized by its tropical climate. It offers in this tourist week a programming of cultural, artistic activities and its time invites to make one covered by this province and to know its tourist attractions as Huamampata and the Thermal Waters of Tocuy.

Populated places in the Amazonas Region